Oonops hasselti is a spider species found in Scandinavia.

See also 
 List of Oonopidae species

References

External links 

Oonopidae
Spiders of Europe
Fauna of Norway
Spiders described in 1906